The Sud Aviation/Aérospatiale SA-610 Ludion (Ludion - Cadet) was a tiny, unorthodox VTOL aircraft demonstrated at the 1967 Paris Air Show. It consisted of little more than a chair, behind which were mounted two downward-pointing augmented rocket engines with control provided by thrust vectoring. The Ludion was intended to carry its pilot and 30 kg (66 lb) of equipment up to 700 m (2,300 ft) at an altitude of up to 200 m (600 ft).

The unusual powerplant consisted of a monofuel de-composition chamber fed with pressurised isopropyl nitrate (AVPIN), ignited by a catalyst. The high pressure gasses produced in the de-composition chamber were fed to two augmentor tubes, built by Bertin, either side of the pilots seat, angled slightly outwards. As the gasses entered the augmentor tubes through rocket nozzles, thrust was augmented by inducing airflow through the ducts which acted as aero-thermo-dynamic ducts, due to the heat and kinetic energy added to the flow through the ducts, and the carefully shaped exhaust nozzles.

Specifications (SA-610 Ludion)

See also

References

External links

Description of the Ludion
Another description of the Ludion
Sud-Aviation SA-610 Ludion (1967-1968) - Youtube video

Aérospatiale aircraft
1960s French experimental aircraft
VTOL aircraft
Aircraft first flown in 1967
Rocket-powered aircraft